CSU Alba Iulia is a Romanian rugby union club currently playing in the Liga Națională de Rugby. It was founded in 2007.

Current squad
In the 2022 edition of the Liga Națională de Rugby, the current squad is as follows:

References

External links
Liga Nationala Rugby link

Romanian rugby union teams